The 1934–35 Magyar Kupa (English: Hungarian Cup) was the 17th season of Hungary's annual knock-out cup football competition.

Final

See also
 1934–35 Nemzeti Bajnokság I

References

External links
 Official site 
 soccerway.com

1934–35 in Hungarian football
1934–35 domestic association football cups
1934-35